Chahar Gushli (also Romanized as Chahār Gūshlī; also known as Chahār Gūsheh and Chehār Gūsheh) is a village in Binalud Rural District, in the Central District of Nishapur County, Razavi Khorasan Province, Iran. At the 2006 census, its population was 251, in 63 families.

References 

Populated places in Nishapur County